Richard Manning Russell (March 3, 1891 – February 27, 1977) was a United States Representative from Massachusetts. He was born in Cambridge on March 3, 1891, to Governor William Russell and Margaret Manning Swan. Russell attended Middlesex School in Concord. He graduated from Harvard University in 1914 and from Harvard Law School in 1917.

During World War I, he served as a second lieutenant in the Three Hundred and Third Field Artillery, and as a first lieutenant and communications officer of the One Hundred and Fifty-first Field Artillery Brigade. He was admitted to the bar and commenced practice in Boston. He was a member of the Cambridge City Council and served as Mayor of Cambridge.

He was elected as a Democrat to the Seventy-fourth Congress (January 3, 1935 – January 3, 1937). He was an unsuccessful candidate for reelection in 1936 to the Seventy-fifth Congress, for election in 1950 to fill a vacancy in the Eighty-first Congress, and for election in 1950 to the Eighty-second Congress. He resumed the practice of law in Boston and resided in Essex, where he died February 27, 1977. His interment was in Pine Hill Cemetery in Tewksbury.

References
 Retrieved on 2009-02-25

1891 births
1977 deaths
Harvard College alumni
Harvard Law School alumni
Massachusetts lawyers
United States Army personnel of World War I
United States Army officers
Mayors of Cambridge, Massachusetts
Massachusetts city council members
Democratic Party members of the United States House of Representatives from Massachusetts
20th-century American politicians
Middlesex School alumni
20th-century American lawyers